"All I Need" is a song by American R&B singer Sterling Simms from his debut studio album, Yours, Mine & The Truth. The single features Jadakiss and The-Dream. The song was produced by Tricky Stewart.

Music video
Simms expressed that he wanted to have the video shot in Philadelphia, Pennsylvania or in Los Angeles, California to give himself a different look. "Hopefully we'll go in within the next few weeks and shoot the video".

Charts
The single debuted at number 23 on the Bubbling Under R&B/Hip-Hop Singles (#123 on Hot R&B/Hip-Hop Songs) for the week of November 29, 2008.

References

2008 singles
2008 songs
The-Dream songs
Jadakiss songs
Def Jam Recordings singles
Song recordings produced by Tricky Stewart
Songs written by The-Dream
Songs written by Tricky Stewart